Leontodon saxatilis is a species of hawkbit known by the common names lesser hawkbit, rough hawkbit, and hairy hawkbit. It is native to Europe and North Africa but can be found in many other places across the globe as an introduced species and often a noxious weed. This is a dandelion-like herb growing patches of many erect, leafless stems from a basal rosette of leaves. The leaves are 2 to 15 centimeters long, 0.5 to 2.5 centimeters wide, entire or lobed, and green in color. Atop the stems are solitary flower heads which are ligulate, containing layered rings of ray florets with no disc florets. The florets are yellow with toothed tips. The fruit is a cylindrical achene with a pappus of scales. Fruits near the center of the flower head are rough, while those growing along the edges of the head are smooth.

External links
Jepson Manual Treatment
USDA Plants Profile
Photo gallery
Skye Flora
Encyclopedia of Life
Flora of North America

saxatilis
Cichorieae
Edible plants
Leaf vegetables
Flora of Alabama